Oliver Green (born December 1951) is an author and transport historian who has written widely on the history of public transport in London, and in particular on the art and design of London Transport. He is the former head curator and now research fellow at the London Transport Museum. He lectures at Birkbeck College, University of London, and Gresham College.

Selected publications

1980s
The London Transport golden jubilee book, 1933-1983. Daily Telegraph, London, 1983. 
The London Underground: An illustrated history. Ian Allan Publishing, 1987. 
Metro-Land: 1932 edition. Oldcastle Books, Harpenden, 1987 (Introduction).

1990s
Art for the London Underground: London Transport posters 1908 to the present. Rizzoli, New York, 1990. 
Underground art: London Transport posters, 1908 to the present. Studio Vista, London, 1990. 
Designed for London: 150 years of transport design. Laurence King, London, 1995. (With Jeremy Rewse-Davies)

2000s and 2010s
London Transport posters: A century of art and design. Lund Humphries, 2008. (Edited with David Bownes) 
Discovering London railway stations. Shire, London, 2010.  
The tube: Station to station on the London Underground. Shire, London, 2012. 
Underground: How the tube shaped London. Allen Lane, London, 2012. (With David Bownes and Sam Mullins) 
British aviation posters: Art, design and flight. Lund Humphries, 2012 (With Scott Anthony) 
Frank Pick's London: Art, design and the modern city. V & A Publishing, London, 2013.

See also

Frank Pick
Johnston (typeface)

References

External links
Oliver Green speaking on The Art of the Underground.
London's Underground Never Sleeps - Oliver Green

Living people
British historians
Academics of Birkbeck, University of London
1951 births